Route 14 is a state highway traveling through the southern part of the U.S. state of Missouri. Its western terminus is at U.S. Route 60 (US 60) in Marionville, and its eastern terminus is at US 63 on the northern edge of West Plains. Route 14 is a two-lane highway for its entire length, however, there are plans to widen Route 14 in some spots.

Formerly this road's western terminus was at US 71 in Joplin, and its eastern terminus was at US 67 southwest of Poplar Bluff. These sections are now US 160, Route 174, and Interstate 44 (I-44). The section between Mount Vernon and the southeast corner of Douglas County was Route 40 from 1922 to 1926.

Route description
Route 14 begins at US 60 in northern Marionville. Shortly after beginning it goes into an old alignment of US 60 making a sharp curve at McKinley. It then heads east joining with (for one mile) U.S. Route 60 and Route 413 where it proceeds to pass through Clever and crosses the James River west of Nixa. At Nixa is an intersection with U.S. Route 160 and Route 13. Route 14 then continues east out of Nixa, through heavier traffic, and crosses Business U.S. Route 65. Route 14 now runs through downtown Ozark united with US 65 and heads on a straight course out of Ozark towards Sparta. The road starts to become more hilly west of Sparta.

Route 14 then joins with Route 125 for two miles (3 km) where it starts to wind its way east towards Ava. Once Route 14 reaches Ava it meets an intersection with Route 76 and Route 5. Route 14 continues on east for twenty-three miles (37 km) more until it intersects Route 95 twenty-eight miles (45 km) west of U.S. Route 63. Route 14 continues twenty-eight miles where it reaches US 63 and then, for 4.8 miles (7.7 km), forms a concurrency with Route 181 towards the twin bridges east. At the end of the concurrency it enters the Mark Twain National Forest and then passes through the hilly country of the Ozarks. Next, Route 14 passes through a town where it then goes 52 miles (84 km) before it reaches another town. After those 52 miles it reaches its end at an intersection with US 63 at the northern boundary of West Plains.

History

Major intersections
Major (numbered state highways) include:

See also

References

014
Transportation in Lawrence County, Missouri
Transportation in Christian County, Missouri
Transportation in Douglas County, Missouri
Transportation in Howell County, Missouri